Morita Kagaku Kogyo Co., Ltd was founded in 1949 as a sweetener manufacturer. With the social trend the company began research on natural products as the alternatives. In 1971 they developed a system for producing a natural stevia sweetener, which was the first in the world.

The company has more recently been involved manufacture of a sweetener based on rebaudioside A, extracted from the stevia leaf.

History

Product

Karori Zero is a Japanese powder-like sweetener product made from the latest technology of Morita Kagaku Kogyo Co., Ltd. It is made with rebaudioside A and Erythritol, which have been proved to be safe for human intake.

References

Chemical companies of Japan